Thiohalorhabdus is a Gram-negative, extremely halophilic and non-motile genus of bacteria from the class Gammaproteobacteria with one known species (Thiohalorhabdus denitrificans). Thiohalorhabdus denitrificans has been isolated from sediments from a hypersaline lake from Siberia in Russia.

References

Gammaproteobacteria
Bacteria genera
Monotypic bacteria genera